The year 1994 was proclaimed the International Year of the Family by the United Nations General Assembly.  Its objectives are promoted by the United Nations Programme on the Family.

This was one of many International observances declared for specific days, months and years.

In October 1994, the United Nations Secretary-General opened the three-day International Conference on Families, saying:

References

External links

Family, International Year of the
Family
1994 in the United Nations